Mimema is a genus of beetles in the family Monotomidae, containing the following species:

 Mimema pallidum Wollaston, 1861
 Mimema tricolor Wollaston, 1861

References

Monotomidae
Cucujoidea genera